John Thomas Browne, 4th Marquess of Sligo (10 September 1824 – 30 December 1903), styled Lord John Browne until 1868, was an Irish politician and naval commander.

Browne served as a Liberal Member of Parliament for Mayo in Ireland from 1857 to 1868. He had previously served as an officer of the Royal Navy.

He died unmarried and was succeeded by his brother, Henry.

References

 G. E. C., ed. Geoffrey F. White. The Complete Peerage. (London: St Catherine Press, 1953) Vol. XII, Part 1, p. 26.

External links

1824 births
1903 deaths
Royal Navy officers
Politicians from County Mayo
Browne
Browne
Browne
Browne
UK MPs who inherited peerages
Browne
John
John 4